Dr. Shrinker is an American death metal band from Milwaukee, Wisconsin, that formed in October 1987. Being obscure, the band only came to wider attention with the release of a posthumous split EP with Nunslaughter and a discography CD, released in 2004 by Necroharmonic Productions. Three of the group's members (Tony Brandt, Scott McKillop, Matt Grassberger) would also play in Phantasm, a group in some ways similar to Dr. Shrinker, and released their debut album "The Abominable". The band broke up by January 1991, only lasting 4 years. The band has reformed in January 2013.

The Eponym was produced by Eric Greif.

Band members

Last known lineup
Jim Potter - guitar
Jesse Kehoe - drums
Jason Hellman - bass
Rich Noonan - vocals

Former members
Chad Hensel - guitar (1988-1991)
James Mayer - drums  (1990-1991)
Tony Brandt - drums   (1990)
Dave Priem - drums (1988-1990)
Doug Cvetkovich - drums (1987-1988)
Brian Rehak - drums  (2013)
Matt Grassberger - bass (1987-1990, 1991, 2013-2014)
Scott McKillop - bass (1990)

Discography
1988 - Recognition demo
1989 - Wedding the Grotesque demo
1990 - The Eponym demo
1994 - History of Things to Come Compilation (Growing Deaf Entertainment)
2001 - Split 7-inch EP with Nunslaughter (Revenge Productions)
2004 - Grotesque Wedlock Compilation of 1988-1990 demos (Necroharmonic Productions)
2015 - 1990 Practice Sessions Limited Cassette release (Dread Records)
2015 - Contorted Dioramic Palette (Dread Records)

References

External links
Dread Records
Necroharmonic Productions

American death metal musical groups
Musical groups established in 1987
Musical groups disestablished in 1991
Heavy metal musical groups from Wisconsin
1987 establishments in Wisconsin
1991 disestablishments in Wisconsin